Michał Globisz (born 11 December 1946 in Poznań) is a Polish football player and coach, from 1982 until 2010 he had been part of the PZPN serving as a youth coach, winning the silver medal at the U-16 European Championship in 1999 and winning a gold medal in the U-18 European Championship in 2001.

Education
From 1964–1969 Globisz studied at the University of Gdańsk in Sopot. In 1978, he finished with a football license from the Akademia Wychowania Fizycznego Józefa Piłsudskiego in Warsaw. He has a class 1 degree.

Player career
He lived in Poznań until he was 10 years old. After moving to Wrocław, he played for his first football club Śląsk Wrocław. He then moved again in 1961 to Gdańsk where he played for the Lechia Gdańsk and Arka Gdynia youth teams. In college, he played for AZS WSE Sopot.

Coaching career
In 1974, he agreed to join as a youth coach Lechia Gdańsk. In 1981, Globisz managed to finish in 3rd place in the Polish Championship. In July of the same year, he received his first job as a head coach with Lechia Gdańsk. During the 1981–1982 season, Lechia played in the 2nd division of the Polish League. In March 1982, he moved back to his position as a youth coach. He again was the manager from September 1984 to December 1984 where he managed Lechia in the First Division of the 1984–1985 season. After his dismissal, he agreed to become the assistant manager to Wojciech Łazarek. His last season as a staff member of Lechia Gdańsk was in the fall of the 1985–1986 season.

He began his work as the coach of the Polish Youth National Teams in March 1996. In October 1998, he managed to qualify to the U-16 European Championship. In the April 1999 tournament in the Czech Republic, Globisz led the team to the finals eliminating the Russia, Croatia, Portugal and the host nation Czech Republic. However, the Spanish team won the final 4:1. On November 1999 Globisz managed to qualify the team for the 1999 U-17 World Cup in New Zealand. However, the team did not qualify out of the group.

In the 2000–2001 season, Globisz managed to qualify for the 2001 U-18 European Championship by eliminating the England in the 2nd qualifying round. The tournament began in July 2001 in Finland. The Poles topped their group beating Spain, Belgium and Denmark and advanced to the final. Poland beat the Czech Republic 3:1 to win the Golden Medal.

Globisz notably coached players such as Tomasz Kuszczak, Paweł Golański, Sebastian Mila, Rafał Grzelak, Łukasz Madej, Wojciech Łobodziński, Radosław Matusiak as well as brothers Paweł Brożek and Piotr Brożek.

Globisz replaced Andrzej Sikorski as the new coach of the players born around 1987 in January 2002. He was unsuccessful in qualifying for the U-17 European Championship in 2004. Poland automatically qualified for the U-19 European Championship in 2006 since they were the host nation. The Poles finished in 3rd place in the group and qualified for the 2007 U-20 World Cup in Canada.

The World Cup took place in July 2007 with Poland beating Brazil 1–0. They lost to the US and then managed to draw against South Korea. Poland qualified for the next round and was matched against the eventual winners Argentina. They lost the match 3–1, with Dawid Janczyk scoring the only Polish goal.

From 2006 Michał Globisz was the national youth team coach for players born in 1990. In 2007, the team were eliminated in the 2nd Qualifying Phase of the U-17 European Championship.

 1974-1981 – Lechia Gdańsk, Youth Team Coach
 1981-1982 – Lechia Gdańsk, Manager
 1982-1984 – U-20 Polish National Team Coach
 1984       Lechia Gdańsk, Manager
 1985-1986 – Lechia Gdańsk, Assistant Manager to Wojciech Łazarek
 1986       Lechia Gdańsk, Manager

Coaching Achievements
 2nd Place in U-16 European Championship in 1999, qualified for 1999 U-17 World Cup
 1st Place in U-18 European Championship in 2001, qualified for 2001 U-18 European Championship
 Played in U-19 European Championship in 2006, qualified for 2007 U-20 World Cup
 Finished in 2nd round of 2007 U-20 World Cup

Personal life

Globisz is commemorated by a star at the MOSiR Stadium in Gdańsk. The "Avenue of Stars" commemorates the efforts and success of former players and coaches.

References

External links

1946 births
Polish footballers
Polish football managers
Lechia Gdańsk managers
Living people
Footballers from Poznań
Association footballers not categorized by position